Tahini cookie is a cookie made of tahini, flour, sugar and butter and usually topped with almonds or pine nuts.

Preparation
The traditional way to prepare tahini cookies is to combine flour, sugar and butter until it creates a crumbly mixture before adding in the raw tahini. Balls of dough are then shaped into round, flat cookies, oftentimes with almonds or pine nuts pressed into them. The baked cookie resembles a shortbread.
Variations that include adding cinnamon, rose water, orange blossom water, date molasses or grape molasses are widespread across Israel.

See also
 List of cookies
 List of Turkish desserts
 Israeli cuisine

Israeli desserts
Cookies
Jewish cookies
Sesame dishes